Aristophanes (active between 430 and 400 BC in Athens) was an ancient Greek vase painter of the Attic red-figure style. Three pieces signed by him are known. Two of them are bowls made by the potter Erginos, now in Berlin (Antikensammlung Berlin) and Boston (Museum of Fine Arts), the third is the fragment of a krater in Agrigento (Museo Archeologico Regionale). A number of further works are attributed to him. Aristophanes strove to make his figures appear as lively as possible. His paintings are characterised by carefully drawn separate lines. In some cases, the drawing of garment folds or women's hair leads to a somewhat artificial impression.

Selected works
Agrigento, Museo Archeologico Regionale
fragment of a bell krater
Berlin, Antikensammlung
loutrophoros F 2373 • bowl 2531 • lekythos F 2706
Boston, Museum of Fine Arts
bowl 00.344 • bowl 00.345
St. Petersburg, Eremitage
bowl

Sources
Carl Robert. Aristophanes (16). In: DNP, Vol. 1, 4. fasc., col. 1005.
Künstlerlexikon der Antike I (2001) 92-93 Aristophanes (G. Bröker).

5th-century BC deaths
Ancient Greek vase painters
Year of birth unknown